Amylibacter marinus is a Gram-negative, aerobic, mesophilic and non-motile bacterium from the genus of Amylibacter which has been isolated from seawater near Muroto in Japan.

References

Rhodobacteraceae
Bacteria described in 2014